Craig Hugh Smyth (1915–2006) was an American art historian who studied Renaissance art, with a special emphasis on the artist Bronzino. During World War II, he established the Allied Munich Central Collecting Point for Nazi-looted art, as part of the Monuments, Fine Arts, and Archives program.

Biography
Smyth attended Princeton University, where he earned his BA (1938), MFA (1941), and PhD (1956), all in art history.  He joined the naval reserve during World War II, and soon became part of the Monuments, Fine Arts, and Archives division.  As an MFAA officer, in 1945 he established the Allied collecting point in Munich.  After the war, he led the first academic program in conservation in the United States at the New York University Institute of Fine Arts (1950-1973).  He was also the director of Harvard University's Center for Italian Renaissance Studies at Villa I Tatti in Florence (1973-1985). He was a member of both the American Academy of Arts and Sciences (1978) and the American Philosophical Society (1979).

Works and publications
Renaissance Studies in Honor of Craig Hugh Smyth. Florence: Giunti Barbèra, 1985
Bronzino Studies (with a Book of) Illustrations.  Princeton University, 1956 (dissertation)
Mannerism and Maniera. Locust Valley, NY:  J. J. Augustin, 1963
Lukehart, Peter M.  The Early Years of Art History in the United States:  Notes and Essays on Departments, Teaching, and Scholars.  Princeton, NJ:  Dept. of Art and Archaeology, Princeton University, 1993  *Bronzino as Draughtsman; an Introduction.  Locust Valley, NY: J. J. Augustin 1971
Garfagnini, Gian Carlo. Florence and Milan: Comparisons and Relations: Acts of Two Conferences at Villa I Tatti in 1982-1984. 2 vols.   Florence: La Nuova Italia editrice, 1989; 
Repatriation of Art from the Collecting Point in Munich after World War II. The Hague: Gary Schwartz/SDU, 1988; 
Millon, Henry A. Michelangelo architetto: la facciata di San Lorenzo e la cupola di San Pietro. Milan: Olivetti, 1988, (English: Michelangelo Architect: the Facade of San Lorenzo and the Drum and Dome of St. Peter's.  Milan: Olivetti, 1988)

Notes and references

External links
 Interviews with art historians 1991-2002, Interviews with art historians 1991-2002 Getty Research Institute
 Craig Hugh Smyth Papers at the National Gallery of Art

1915 births
2006 deaths
American art historians
Monuments men
Art and cultural repatriation after World War II
United States Navy personnel of World War II
United States Navy officers
Members of the American Philosophical Society